Hockey India plans, directs and conducts all the activities for both men and women hockey in India. It is recognized by the Ministry of Youth Affairs and Sports, Government of India as the sole body responsible towards promoting Hockey in India. It was formed after Indian Hockey Federation was dismissed in 2008 by IOA.

Headquartered in New Delhi, Hockey India was established on 20 May 2009 and is affiliated to the International Hockey Federation (FIH), the Indian Olympic Association (IOA) and Asian Hockey Federation (AHF).

Hockey India with the assistance of Sports Authority of India and Department of Sports, Government of India, trains players at sub-junior, junior and senior level. The governing body engages in Coaching the coaches, educates and equips technical officials and umpires.

ia launched its own logo in a ceremony on 24 July 2008, in India. It resembles Ashok Chakra of Indian flag. It is made up of hockey sticks.

Hockey India manages four squads that represent India in international field hockey:  the India men's national field hockey team, the India women's national field hockey team, the India men's national under-21 field hockey team and the India women's national under-21 field hockey team.

Hockey India Member Units
Hockey India's Member Units are divided into four separate categories, namely Permanent Members, Associate Members, Academy Members and Hockey Members.

State and UT Hockey Associations
 Hockey Andaman and Nicobar
 Hockey Arunachal
 Assam Hockey
 Hockey Bengal
 Hockey Bihar
 Chhattisgarh Hockey
 Delhi Hockey
 Goans Hockey
 Hockey Gujarat
 Hockey Haryana
 Hockey Himachal
 Hockey Jammu and Kashmir
 Hockey Jharkhand
 Hockey Karnataka
 Kerala Hockey
 Hockey Madhya Pradesh
 Hockey Maharashtra
 Manipur Hockey
 Hockey Mizoram
 Hockey Nagaland
 Hockey Association of Odisha
 Le Puducherry Hockey
 Hockey Punjab
 Hockey Rajasthan
 Hockey Unit of Tamil Nadu
 Telangana Hockey
 Tripura Hockey
 Uttar Pradesh Hockey
 Hockey Uttarakhand

Competitions

Hockey India National Championships
These National Championships are divided into two divisions (A Division & B Division) each for all the competitions to ensure that the participating teams are competing in a fair, equal environment, and against teams with similar level of hockey.

Below is the list of National Championships that Hockey India conducts every season:
Hockey India Senior Men National Championship
Hockey India Senior Women National Championship
Hockey India Junior Men National Championship
Hockey India Junior Women National Championship
Hockey India Sub-Junior Men National Championship
Hockey India Sub-Junior Women National Championship
Hockey India 5-a-side National Championship (Women)
Hockey India 5-a-side National Championship (Men) 
Hockey India 5-a-side National Championship (Mixed)

Leagues
 Hockey India League

All India Hockey Tournaments
All India MCC Murugappa Gold Cup Hockey Tournament
All India Obaidullah Khan Gold Cup Hockey Tournament
Surjit Memorial Hockey Tournament
Senior Nehru Hockey Tournament
Lal Bahadur Shastri Hockey Tournament
Beighton Cup
All India Scindia Gold Cup Hockey Tournament
All India Swami Shradhanand Hockey Tournament
All India Guru Teg Bahadur Gold Cup Hockey Tournament
Mahant Raja Sarwesjwardas Memorial All India Tournament
All India Guru Gobind Singh Gold Cup Hockey Tournament
All India Trades Cup Hockey Tournament
All India Police Hockey Championship
Aga Khan Hockey Tournament
All India K.D Singh Babu Memorial Invitation Prize Money Hockey Tournament
Lychettira Hockey Cup/Kodava Hockey Festival
Bombay Gold Cup
Liberals All India Hockey Tournament

Office bearers and Executive Board

Executive Board
The following are the members of the executive board of Hockey India.

Officers and Employees
The following are the officers and employees of Hockey India.
Elena Norman – CEO
Cdr R.K. Srivastava – Executive Director
BN Bhushan – Joint Director
Ranjit Gill – Joint Director
Kuldeep Singh – Sr. Manager – Protocol
Vikram Pal – Sr. Manager – Competitions and Development
Rakesh Kumar – Sr. Manager – Purchase and Administration
Ahad Azim – Sr. Manager – Coordination
Mahender Singh Negi – Assistant Manager - Purchase & Administration
Bhupender Singh – Assistant Manager Coordination
Ankit Walia – Assistant Manager Coordination
Priyanka Yadav – P.A. to CEO
Vaishali Rathore – Senior Officer Coordination
Bhagyashree Das – Officer Coordination
Indrashis Chatterjee – Officer Coordination
Vishal Sengar – Officer Coordination
Akash Choubey – Officer Coordination
Wasim – Office Assistant
Sanjeev – Office Assistant
Manohar Lal – Office Assistant
Prem – Office Assistant
Davender Kumar Sharma – Project Manager - CSR
Deepak Kumar Mishra – Procurement Manager - CSR

Past office bearers

Presidents
The following is a list of presidents of Indian Hockey Federation and Hockey India:

Hockey India awards
Hockey India instituted the "Hockey India Annual Awards" from 2014 for recognition of hockey players for promoting field hockey as a sport on both national and international platform.

Major Dhyan Chand Lifetime Achievement Award
2014: Balbir Singh Sr.
2015: Shankar Lakshman
2019: Harbinder Singh

Balbir Singh Sr. Award for Player of the Year (Men)
2014: Birendra Lakra
2015: P. R. Sreejesh
2019: Manpreet Singh

Balbir Singh Sr. Award for Player of the Year (Women)
2014: Vandana Katariya
2015: Deepika Thakur
2019: Rani Rampal

Jugraj Singh Award for Upcoming Player of the Year (Men – Under 21)
2014: Harmanpreet Singh
2015: Harjeet Singh
2019: Vivek Sagar Prasad

Asunta Lakra Award for Upcoming Player of the Year (Women – Under 21)
2014: Namita Toppo
2015: Preeti Dubey
2019: Lalremsiami

Dhanraj Pillay Award for Forward of the Year
2014: Akashdeep Singh
2015: Rani Rampal
2019: Mandeep Singh

Ajit Pal Singh Award for Midfielder of the Year
2014: Manpreet Singh
2015: Ritu Rani
2019: Neha Goyal

Pargat Singh Award for Defender of the Year
2014: Deepika Thakur
2015: Kothajit Singh
2019: Harmanpreet Singh

Baljit Singh Award for Goalkeeper of the Year
2014: P. R. Sreejesh
2015: Savita Punia
2019: Krishan Pathak

Jaman Lal Sharma Award for Invaluable Contribution
2014: Harendra Singh
2015: Baldev Singh
2019: Sports Authority of India

Hockey India President's Award for Outstanding Achievement
2014: One Thousand Hockey Legs
2015: Madhya Pradesh Hockey Academy
2019: Department of Sports & Youth Services, Government of Odisha

See also
International Hockey Federation
Asian Hockey Federation
Field hockey in India

References

India
Hockey
 
Field hockey governing bodies in Asia
2008 establishments in Delhi
Sports organizations established in 2008